Cyclic nucleotide-gated cation channel alpha-4 is a protein that in humans is encoded by the CNGA4 gene.

CNGA4 is a modulatory subunit of vertebrate cyclic nucleotide-gated membrane channels that transduce odorant signals (Munger et al., 2001).[supplied by OMIM]

See also
 Cyclic nucleotide-gated ion channel

References

Further reading

External links 
 

Ion channels